Chamberlain was a brand of tractors from Australia, produced initially by Chamberlain Industries Ltd.

While Bob Chamberlain was working as a tractor mechanic in Victoria he designed a tractor and built a prototype tractor around what he believed farmers wanted. It became the basis of the 40K model tractor.

The Western Australian Government having heard of Bob Chamberlain's plan to build tractors persuaded the Chamberlains to use an ex-munitions factory; in Welshpool, Western Australia. Thus the first Tractors rolled off the production line in 1949.

The first Chamberlain tractor produced was the model 40k which had  twin-cylinder, horizontally opposed engines. They weighed about four tonnes and were considered to be ideal for the needs of Australian farmers.

In 1953 Chamberlain started to produce diesel powered tractors such as the  GM diesel powered 60DA and later the 70DA, as well as the 55DA, which was powered by an Australian built diesel engine. A few years later the production of kerosene powered tractors was stopped. In 1955 Chamberlain developed the Perkins diesel powered Champion models and as a publicity stunt in the same year Chamberlains entered the new diesel powered tractor in the around Australia Redex Trial as a rescue/recovery vehicle.  It became known as "Tail End Charlie" The tractor in question was fitted with modified cab, bench seat and high speed gears (allowing it to reach speeds of up to 110 km/hour). Initial attempts to enter the event were met with disbelief, and it was only officially recognised as a recovery vehicle for one leg of the trial. Tail-End Charlie is reputed to have completed one stage of the trial while towing as many as six other entrants that broke down on the way. In a subsequent trial, the powers that be relented, and the Chamberlain machine completed the whole course.

In subsequent years, Chamberlain produced a range of iconic larger tractors suited to broadland farming in Australia. These tractors are now popular for heritage tractor pulling contests, and feature their own national championships.

An expansion and refit of the Welshpool Plant was undertaken in 1978. The Welshpool manufacturing site was redeveloped and a new office complex built in 1982, however by 1986 due to significant decline in demand, the manufacture of the famous Chamberlain tractors ceased.

John Deere Merger
In 1970, the John Deere Company of America purchased a controlling interest in Chamberlain.

During the 1980s, Chamberlain became a fully owned subsidiary of John Deere, thus trading as Chamberlain John Deere.

Chamberlain tractors on display at the 2007 Perth Royal Show

References

External links

Chamberlain 9G Tractor Club
Gibbs Family Tractor Collection of Wunkar, South Australia

John Deere
Chamberlain Tractors
Companies of Australia